Pterostylis amabilis is a species of orchid endemic to eastern Australia. As with similar orchids, the flowering plants differ from those which are not flowering. The non-flowering plants have a rosette of leaves but the flowering plants lack a rosette at the base but have up to ten tiny white and red to reddish-brown flowers. It is similar to P. parviflora but has larger rosette leaves and larger, more brightly coloured flowers.

Description
Pterostylis amabilis is a terrestrial, perennial, deciduous, herb with an underground tuber and when not flowering, a rosette of three to five bright green, broad egg-shaped leaves which lie flat on the ground. Up to five leaf rosettes are arranged on the side of the flowering spike. The flowers are bright reddish-brown and white and usually up to four are open at once. The dorsal sepal and petals are fused, forming a hood or "galea" over the column. The galea has an inflated shape near its base and rough surface. The sinus between the bases of the lateral sepals bulges forward and curves inward at the top. The labellum is not visible from outside the intact flower. Flowering occurs mainly in February and March.

Taxonomy and naming
This greenhood was first formally described in 2014 by David Jones and Lachlan Copeland and given the name Speculantha amabilis. The description was published in the Australian Orchid Review. In 2015 Jones changed the name to Pterostylis amabilis "to allow for the different taxonomic views held at generic level within the subtribe". The specific epithet (amabilis) is a Latin word meaning "lovely", referring to the colour of the flowers.

Distribution and habitat
Pterostylis amabilis grows in rich soil in moist, tall forest on the higher parts of the New England Tableland.

References

amabilis
Endemic orchids of Australia
Orchids of New South Wales
Plants described in 2014